Barahona is the professional male volleyball team representing Barahona Province.

History
The team was found in 2007.

Current volleyball squad
As of December 2008

 Coach:  Franklin Segura
 Assistant coach:  Keisy Feliz

References

External links
League Official website

Dominican Republic volleyball clubs
Volleyball clubs established in 2007